The 1915 Yale Bulldogs football team was an American football team that represented Yale University as an independent during the 1915 college football season. The Bulldogs finished with a 4–5 record under second-year head coach Frank Hinkey.  It was the first losing season in Yale Bulldogs football history.  No Yale player was a consensus All-American, though guard Clinton Black was selected as a first-team player by New York sports writer Monty on his 1915 College Football All-America Team.

Schedule

References

Yale
Yale Bulldogs football seasons
Yale Bulldogs football